Neil Kelly (born 10 May 1962) is an English rugby league coach and former professional player who was the head coach of Cornwall RLFC.

Coaching career

Leigh Centurions
On his return to England and Rugby League Neil spent two years as the Head Coach and then Director of Football at Leigh Centurions Rugby League Club, competing in the Co-Operative Rugby League Championship.

Ulster
Kelly spent two and a half years working as the defence coach for Ulster Rugby Union Club.

Widnes Vikings
Whilst at Widnes, the club won the Grand Final.

Dewsbury Rams
No promotion for Dewsbury after Grand Final win.

Cornwall RLFC
On 8 Dec 2021 it was announced that Neil had been appointed as head coach of new club Cornwall RLFC.

On 24 October 2022 it was announced that Neil's assistant Mike Abbott had taken over as head coach by mutual consent.

Genealogical information
Neil Kelly is one of three brothers to play professional Rugby League, Andrew "Andy" Kelly who played for Wakefield Trinity, Hull Kingston Rovers and Illawarra Steelers (Australia), and Richard Kelly who played for Wakefield Trinity and Dewsbury.

References

External links
2011 Knights Coach Kelly aids RU World Cup Finals Team
2011 Kelly Coaches Namibian RU World Cup Team
2010 Kelly & Goulding Rally to Stricken Percivals Cause
2009 Roles Change at Leigh Centurions
2008 Kelly Joins Leigh
2005 Ulster Retain Coach Neil Kelly
2004 Super League Coach of the Year Joins Ulster RU
2004 Ulster Delighted to Secure Neil Kelly
2002 Welsh Coach Kelly Reappointed For New Zealand Challenge
2001 Kelly's Brave Wales Run England Close
2001 Neil Kelly Appointed as Wales Rugby Boss
2001 Kelly Steers Widnes to Grand Final Glory
New Zealand 50 Wales 22 Cardiff
Eaton drives Dewsbury to big pay day
Dewsbury's import sent home
Knights bring in Kelly
Neil Kelly video
Neil Kelly Audio Interview
Neil Kelly Audio
Neil Kelly on the Namibian job

1962 births
Living people
Cornwall RLFC coaches
Dewsbury Rams coaches
Dewsbury Rams players
English male kickboxers
English rugby league coaches
English rugby league players
English rugby union coaches
Featherstone Rovers players
Houston SaberCats coaches
Hunslet R.L.F.C. players
Leigh Leopards coaches
Rugby league players from Wakefield
Rugby league hookers
Rugby league locks
Ulster Rugby non-playing staff
Wakefield Trinity players
Wales national rugby league team coaches
Widnes Vikings coaches